Morgan Dealie Wade (born December 10, 1994) is an American country music singer. Active since 2018, she has released one album on Thirty Tigers in 2021.

Biography
Morgan Wade is a native of Floyd, Virginia. She began writing songs as a freshman in college, and in 2018, she recruited musicians through Craigslist to record her first album Puppets with My Heart, which was credited to The Stepbrothers. Wade told Rolling Stone Country that she was inspired to do this after breaking up with her boyfriend. Wade later said that the stress of touring and recording with the Stepbrothers led to her developing an alcohol addiction.

Later in 2018, Morgan Wade was performing at FloydFest along with many artists including Jason Isbell. Isbell's sound engineer gave her album to Sadler Vaden, the guitarist in Isbell's band The 400 Unit.

Vaden and producer Paul Ebersold then helped her assemble another album over the next two years. Titled Reckless, the album was released via the Thirty Tigers label in 2021. Selling 3,000 copies in its first week, Reckless charted at number 14 on the Billboard Top Heatseekers charts. Wade told the publication that the album was inspired by her struggles with her mental health, past relationships, and sobriety. Rolling Stone Country describes the album by saying that Wade has "the ragged edge of a singer-songwriter who’s been putting her nose to the grindstone for some time. In a voice like worn leather, Wade describes desperate, spontaneous relationships that feel the strongest when they’re at their breaking point."

"Wilder Days" was released to radio in 2021 as the album's first single. Billy Dukes of Taste of Country described Wade's vocal presence on the song as a "hardened Sheryl Crow" and called the song "complex, with chords and a melancholy shuffle that shouts heartbreak, even if her story is at worst hesitant and thoughtful."

Wade re-released Reckless on January 28, 2022 with six bonus tracks. One of them is a cover of Elvis Presley's 1969 hit "Suspicious Minds". The re-release was issued through Arista Nashville.

Discography

Albums

Singles

References

1994 births
American women country singers
American country singer-songwriters
Arista Nashville artists
Country musicians from Virginia
Living people
People from Floyd County, Virginia
Thirty Tigers artists
21st-century American women singers
21st-century American singers
Singer-songwriters from Virginia